The ruins of the Chailey Heritage Marine Hospital stand to the seaward side of Tide Mills, east of Newhaven, Sussex, in England.

History

The hospital, which was built to provide aftercare and recovery for disabled boys who had undergone surgery, opened in 1924. The hospital formed part of the Chailey Heritage School founded by Dame Grace Kimmins to provide education for disabled boys. Muriel Powell was matron of the hospital from its opening until her resignation in 1933.

The War Office regarded the area as a potential invasion site and considered that the buildings might provide cover for invading German forces; the hospital was therefore demolished in 1940 during the Second World War

See also
 Healthcare in Sussex
 List of hospitals in England

References

External links
 Friends of The Tidemills and Newhaven Eastside Conservation Group
Newhaven Museum

Hospital buildings completed in 1924
Archaeological sites in East Sussex
Hospitals in East Sussex
Defunct hospitals in England
1924 establishments in England
Newhaven, East Sussex